Laurie Binder (born August 10, 1947) is an American long-distance runner.  She was a four-time winner of the San Francisco Bay to Breakers race, tied with Maryetta Boitano for the most victories, setting the first course record when the race was shortened to 12 km at 41.24.7.

Biography
She won the 1981 San Francisco Marathon, the year the race served as the national championship, making her the United States National Champion in the Marathon.  Later in her 40s she was voted the "Masters Age Division Athlete of the Year" four consecutive times between 1988 and 1991  In 2014, she was elected into the USATF Masters Hall of Fame.

Achievements

References

1947 births
Living people
American female long-distance runners
American female marathon runners
American masters athletes
Track and field athletes from California
21st-century American women